Mariette d'Enghien, née Yolande d'Enghien (fl. 1402), was a French noble, mistress of the French prince Louis d'Orleans, brother of King Charles VI.

Life
Mariette (born Yolande) d'Enghien was the daughter of Jacques d'Enghien, Castellan of Mons by either his first wife, Marie de Roucy de Pierrepont.  She was known as the Lady of Wiège and Fagnoles, lands she violently seized from her uncle and grandfather. In 1389, she was married to Aubert Le Flamenc, Lord of Cany and Chamberlain to the king, Charles VI of France.

Mariette d'Enghien became the mistress of Louis I, Duke of Orléans, brother of King Charles VI.  Their son, Jean de Dunois, was born in 1402 and became the comrade in arms of Joan of Arc.

She died at Claix, Isère.

Mariette d'Enghien in fiction

She is a character in the novel In a Dark Wood Wandering by Hella S. Haasse.

Notes

References

Further reading
 Étienne Pattou,  (Genealogy of the Lords of Enghien)
Biography from Oriflamme - French Medieval history page
Brief Biography

Year of birth missing
Year of death missing
Mistresses of French royalty
14th-century French women
14th-century French people